National Insurance was a planned system of social security in Australia which would have provided medical, disability, unemployment and pension coverage to its contributors and their dependents. The scheme was passed into law by the Lyons Government as the National Health and Pensions Insurance Act 1938, but was abandoned the following year in order to divert funds to defence.

Background
There were few serious proposals for a comprehensive social insurance scheme in Australia before World War I, as it was seen as unfeasible. In 1911, Joseph Cook told federal parliament that "the more I think of it the more convinced I am that we must come ultimately to a form of national insurance which will give every man–the millionaire as well as the poor man–who has subscribed to his own insurance fund the right to receive that insurance, without taint of pauperism or charity, in his old age".

Advocates of greater federal government involvement in healthcare were divided between those who supported centralised public health services providing universal healthcare and those who supported contributory insurance-based schemes.

Bruce–Page Government
At the 1922 federal election, the Country Party's platform included plans for a national insurance scheme covering "sickness, unemployment, poverty and age". After the election the party's leader Earle Page, a trained surgeon and strong supporter of the scheme, entered into a coalition with the Nationalist Party under S. M. Bruce, who became prime minister. In 1923, the new government announced plans for a comprehensive social services system that would "remove altogether the taint of pauperism". It subsequently established the Royal Commission on National Insurance under the chairmanship of Nationalist senator John Millen which ran from 7 September 1923 to 5 October 1927.

1938 legislation

The Lyons Government, a coalition between the United Australia Party and Australian Country Party, was re-elected at the 1937 federal election on a platform which included a national insurance scheme covering both old-age pensions and healthcare. The strongest advocates of national insurance within the UAP were treasurer Richard Casey and former minister Frederick Stewart, while Prime Minister Joseph Lyons was lukewarm towards the idea and many Country MPs were hostile.

Drafting and provisions
The government's legislation was largely modelled on its British equivalents and was drafted by British civil servants. However, unlike in the UK, administrative control over the scheme was to be vested in a National Insurance Commission. Its final form was largely due to financial considerations, with the legislation required the scheme to become self-financing as soon as possible. It ultimately included contributory schemes for sickness and disability, old-age pensions, payments for widows and orphans, and child endowment. Many specialist medical services were excluded from the scheme, including anaesthesia, pathology, x-rays, venereal diseases, abortions, miscarriages and stillbirths. The health and pension insurance components (known as the Kinnear scheme after their author) were to be enacted separately to the unemployment insurance component.

Although the Australian branches of the British Medical Association (BMA) were largely in favour of a contributory health insurance scheme, the medical profession ultimately came into conflict with the government over the scheme. The initial conflict was over the size of the capitation fees payable to doctors, with general practitioners claiming they would have to increase their workload in order to maintain their income.

Enactment
The National Health and Pensions Insurance Bill was introduced to parliament on 4 May 1938. The government sought to insurance swift passage of the legislation, as it had suffered losses in the Senate at the previous election and wished to ensure passage before new opposition senators were seated on 1 July. Dissident Country MPs, led by Hubert Lawrence Anthony and Arthur Fadden, secured several concessions.

Aftermath
In 1944, Richard Casey wrote to General Archibald Wavell defending the substance of the scheme and stating that it was inevitable that it would be revived after the war. He stated "it will be my bill and my scheme – and no argument and no playing-of-politics can gainsay that". Casey told journalist Jack Hetherington in 1964 that the decision to abandon the scheme was made “largely at Mr Lyons’ instigation, by reason of his belief that [...] we could not finance it”. However, he wrote to Fred Daly in 1956 that “on my own personal initiative, I recommended to Cabinet the withdrawal of the legislation [...] for reasons that were connected with the quite obvious on-coming war”. Menzies recalled in later years that Casey had recommended to cabinet that the scheme be dropped to avoid political controversy.

See also
 Social Security Act 1938 (New Zealand)

References

Bibliography

Further reading
 
 

1938 establishments in Australia
Social security in Australia
1939 disestablishments in Australia